The BRAT diet is a restrictive diet that was once recommended for people, particularly children, with gastrointestinal distress like vomiting, diarrhea, or gastroenteritis. Evidence, however, does not support a benefit. As of the 21st century, is no longer generally recommended as it is unnecessarily restrictive. The diet was first discussed in 1926.

An acronym, BRAT stands for bananas, rice, apple sauce, and toast, the four food components of the diet. Additionally, it is recommended that all people, regardless of age, drink plenty of fluids to prevent dehydration, along with oral rehydration solutions to replace the depleted electrolytes and avoid salt imbalance. Severe, untreated salt imbalance can result in "extreme weakness, confusion, coma, or death."

Nutritional analysis
The BRAT diet is no longer generally recommended. The American Academy of Pediatrics states that most children should continue a normal, age appropriate diet. The foods from the BRAT diet may be added, but should not replace normal, tolerated foods. Sugary drinks and carbonated beverages should be avoided. The BRAT diet is no longer routinely recommended to those who have had stem cell transplants and have diarrhea due to graft-versus-host disease, as long-term use can lead to nutritional deficiencies.

Adding rice, bananas, or pectin to the diet while suffering from diarrhea may be beneficial, but physicians Debora Duro and Christopher Duggan point out that the diet is not nutritionally complete and may be deficient in energy, fat, protein, fiber, vitamin A, vitamin B12, and calcium.  Duro and Duggan also say that food restriction does not alleviate diarrhea and actually causes individuals to have diarrhea for longer periods, according to randomized clinical trials.

Medical attention is required when on the BRAT diet if any blood or mucus is present in the diarrhea, if the diarrhea is severe, or if it lasts longer than 3 days.

Alternatives 
Additionally, other medical professionals advise first aid treatment for gastroenteritis by briefly limiting the diet to bland, easy-to-digest foods (similar to the BRAT diet) and plenty of liquids (including oral rehydration therapy, e.g. oral pediatric electrolyte solutions sold at retail).

See also
 Compare a bland diet

References 

Diets
1926 introductions
Medical mnemonics